Anghelescu is a Romanian surname that may refer to
Dan Anghelescu (born 1958), Romanian coach and football player
Giulia Anghelescu (born 1984), Romanian pop/dance recording artist 
Marcel Anghelescu (1909–1977), Romanian stage and film actor 

Romanian-language surnames